Lahd Gallery is a contemporary Middle Eastern art gallery. Founded by Nauf AlBendar in 2005 in Riyadh, Saudi Arabia, to create a focal point for women artists from the Persian Gulf, in 2010 it moved to its present location in Hampstead, London.

Lahd Gallery became a well-known exhibition space representing exclusively MENASA (Middle East, North Africa, South Asia) contemporary art. Artists are exposed to an international market using an online e-gallery, as well as yearly international pop venues, fairs and events all over the world.

References

External links
 Lahd Gallery Website

Further reading
 Article on Art Rabbit
 Saatchi Gallery article on Lahd Gallery
 Art London coverage
 Article on Art Review

Contemporary art galleries in London
Art galleries established in 2005
2005 establishments in Saudi Arabia